Allanfearn was a railway station located near Culloden, outside Inverness, Highland, Scotland.

History
The station was opened on 7 November 1855 by the Inverness and Nairn Railway, it was renamed  on 1 November 1898 when the Inverness and Aviemore Direct Railway opened. The line was absorbed by the Inverness and Aberdeen Junction Railway which in turn was absorbed by the Highland Railway, it became part of the London, Midland and Scottish Railway during the Grouping of 1923. The line then passed on to the Scottish Region of British Railways on nationalisation in 1948.

The station was host to a LMS caravan from 1936 to 1939. A camping coach was also positioned here by the Scottish Region from 1957 to 1963.

The station was closed by the British Railways Board in May 1965, along with the other surviving intermediate stations between Inverness & Nairn as a result of the Beeching Axe.

Services

The site today
The closed station buildings survive (next to an automatic half-barrier level crossing) and are now occupied. They are passed by trains on the single track Aberdeen to Inverness Line.  Remains of a platform can also be seen.

Notes

Further reading

External links
 RAILSCOT on Inverness and Nairn Railway
 Subterranea Britannica: SB-Sites:Allanfearn Station
 Station on navigable O.S. map

Disused railway stations in Highland (council area)
Railway stations in Great Britain opened in 1855
Railway stations in Great Britain closed in 1965
Beeching closures in Scotland
Former Highland Railway stations
1855 establishments in Scotland
1965 disestablishments in Scotland